Pollokshields (Ward 6) is one of the 23 wards of Glasgow City Council. On its creation in 2007 and in 2012 it returned three council members, using the single transferable vote system. For the 2017 Glasgow City Council election, the boundaries were changed, the ward increased in size and returned four members.

Boundaries
Located on the South Side of Glasgow, the ward includes Pollokshields itself as well as Crossmyloof, Strathbungo and the western part of Shawlands. The 2017 expansion took in Bellahouston, Craigton and Dumbreck from the Govan ward.

The ethnic makeup of the expanded Pollokshields ward using the 2011 census population statistics was:

69.3% White Scottish / British / Irish / Other
26.9% Asian (Mainly Pakistani)
2% Black (Mainly African)
1.6% Mixed / Other Ethnic Group

This makes it one of the most ethnically diverse wards in Glasgow.

Councillors

Election results

2022 election
2022 Glasgow City Council election

2017 election
2017 Glasgow City Council election

2012 election
2012 Glasgow City Council election

2007 election
2007 Glasgow City Council election

See also
Wards of Glasgow

References

External links
Listed Buildings in Pollokshields Ward, Glasgow City at British Listed Buildings

Wards of Glasgow
Pollokshields